Gilford Aerodrome  is an aerodrome located adjacent to Gilford, Ontario, Canada.

References

Registered aerodromes in Ontario
Transport in Simcoe County